Falls of Clyde is the last surviving iron-hulled, four-masted full-rigged ship, and the only remaining sail-driven oil tanker. Designated a U.S. National Historic Landmark in 1989, she is now a museum ship in Honolulu, but her condition has deteriorated. She is currently not open to the public. In September 2008, ownership was transferred to a new nonprofit organization, the Friends of Falls of Clyde. Efforts to raise $1.5 million to get the ship into drydock did not succeed. In November 2021 HDOT accepted a bid from Save Falls of Clyde – International (FOCI) to transport the ship to Scotland for restoration.

History
Russell and Company built Falls of Clyde in Port Glasgow, Renfrewshire, Scotland. She was launched as the first of nine iron-hulled four-masted ships for Wright and Breakenridge's Falls Line. She was named after the Falls of Clyde, a group of waterfalls on the River Clyde, and built to the highest standard for general worldwide trade, Lloyd's Register A-1. Her maiden voyage took her to Karachi, then in British India, and her first six years were spent engaged in the India trade. She then became a tramp pursuing general cargo such as lumber, jute, cement, and wheat from ports in Australia, California, India, New Zealand, and the British Isles.

After twenty-one years as a British merchant ship, Falls of Clyde was bought for US$25,000 by Captain William Matson of the Matson Navigation Company, taken to Honolulu in 1899, and registered under the Hawaiian flag. When the Republic of Hawaii was annexed by the United States in 1900, it took a special act of the United States Congress to secure the foreign-built ship the right to sail as an American flag vessel.

To economize on crew, Matson rigged Falls of Clyde down as a barque, replacing the five yards on her (jigger) mast with two more easily managed fore-and-aft sails. At the same time, he added a deckhouse, charthouse, and rearranged the after quarters to accommodate paying passengers. From 1899 to 1907, she made over sixty voyages between Hilo, Hawaii, and San Francisco, California, carrying general merchandise west, sugar east, and passengers both ways. She developed a reputation as a handy, fast, and commodious vessel, averaging 17 days each way on her voyages.

Ten large steel tanks were built into her hull, and a pump room, boiler and generator fitted forward of an oil-tight bulkhead. In this configuration she brought kerosene to Hawaii and returned to California with molasses for cattle feed.

In 1927, she was sold to the General Petroleum Company, her masts cut down, and converted into a floating fuel depot in Alaska. In 1959 she was bought by William Mitchell, who towed her to Seattle, Washington, intending to sell her to a preservation group. Mitchell's plan fell through and subsequent efforts by Karl Kortum, director of the San Francisco Maritime Museum, and Fred Klebingat, who had sailed in her as chief mate in 1915, to place her in Long Beach, California, or Los Angeles, California, were similarly disappointed.

In 1963, the bank holding the mortgage on Falls of Clyde decided to sell her to be sunk as part of a breakwater at Vancouver, British Columbia. Kortum and Klebingat aroused interest in the ship in Hawaii, and within days of the scheduled scuttling raised funds to buy the ship. At the end of October 1963, Falls of Clyde was taken under tow bound for Honolulu.

As a museum ship
 
 
Falls of Clyde was given to the Bishop Museum and opened to the public in 1968. In 1970 shipbuilder and industrialist Sir William Lithgow, the grandson of original 19th century designer William Lithgow, was engaged to assist in her restoration as a full-rigged ship. His Port Glasgow shipyard donated new steel masts, and topgallants, jib and spanker booms of Oregon pine.

In 1973 the ship was entered into the National Register of Historic Places, and declared a U.S. National Historic Landmark in 1989.

In 1982 the ship was seriously damaged in Hurricane Iwa. By 2008 she was in poor condition. Causes of the deterioration of the ship are multiple. The ship has not been dry docked for a long time.  Sandblasting arguably damaged the ship. Preventive maintenance was not performed. The Bishop Museum, "has been accused of incompetence and dishonesty" for raising $600,000 to preserve the ship but then spending only about half that, and for other decisions on how the money that was spent.

In 2008, the Bishop Museum announced plans to sink her by the end of the year unless private funds were raised for an endowment for her perpetual care. In September 2008 the Bishop Museum was persuaded to transfer ownership to the non-profit group Friends of Falls of Clyde, which intended to restore her. Many artifacts and fixtures had previously been given away, taken, or otherwise disappeared on the assumption that the ship was to be scuttled. $350,000 was obtained from the Robert J. Pfeiffer Foundation, but hoped-for federal funds under the "Save America's Treasures" program or other programs did not come through. Each year, the Foundation  hoped to get her into drydock but did not succeed. In June 2016 Harbors Division of the Hawaii Department of Transportation (HDOT) revoked the permit for her to moor at Pier 7, citing safety and security risks to port users.

Restoration and repatriation efforts

In August 2016 a group based in Glasgow, Scotland launched the Save Falls of Clyde – International (FOCI) Campaign, with a view to have her returned to Scotland where she was originally built. Initially, they answered a call for help from the charity known as the ‘Friends of the Falls of Clyde’ (FFOC) who owned and wanted to save the FOC from being scuttled. They put together a plan to get her back to Scotland attempting to work with HDOT and building and executing a plan.

In February 2019 HDOT put the ship up for auction but did not receive any qualified bids.

In July 2021 HDOT solicited bids for removal of the ship from Honolulu Harbor, and received two proposals in response. The Foundation challenged the Harbors Division's assessment of the ship, and says they never gave up ownership rights.

In November 2021 HDOT accepted a bid from FOCI to transport the ship to either Greenock or Glasgow where it would be restored and returned to sea. In March 2022 David O'Neill of FOCI said, "There's just a few legal and technical points to be ironed out, and then we will finalise the contract." HDOT canceled the bid in May 2022 after they said FOCI failed to meet conditions of the contract.

In popular culture
 The ship appears as a filming location in Magnum, P.I., Season 2, Episodes 5 and 6, "Memories are Forever" (November 5, 1981) and Season 6, Episode 10, "Blood and Honor" (November 21, 1985).

References

Further reading

External links 

 Hawaiʻi Maritime Center
 Maritime Heritage Program Information for the Falls of Clyde 
 Princess Bernice Pauahi Bishop Museum
 Falls of Clyde on HawaiiWeb
 Friends of Falls of Clyde website
 Falls of Clyde International Ltd
 

Ships built on the River Clyde
History of Inverclyde
Museum ships in Hawaii
National Historic Landmarks in Hawaii
Individual sailing vessels
Sailing ships of Scotland
Tall ships of the United Kingdom
Tall ships of the United States
Tankers of the United States
Museums in Honolulu
Four-masted ships
Windjammers
Oil tankers
Ships on the National Register of Historic Places in Hawaii
1878 ships
Full-rigged ships
Historic American Engineering Record in Hawaii
National Register of Historic Places in Honolulu
1878 in Scotland
Ships and vessels on the National Archive of Historic Vessels